Sajil Sreedhar (സജിൽ ശ്രീധർ) is an Indian author and journalist. He writes in Malayalam. Athikayan, his biography of K. P. Paul, won the S. K. Pottekkatt award in 2016.. He has published thirty-five books in various literary genres such as short story, novel, literary criticism, film criticism, and biography. He has written the biographies of outstanding personalities in Indian society. Authored Biographies of M T Vasudevan Nair, P.S. Sreenivasan, Vellappally Natesan, Kochouseph chittilappally, Thilakan, K.P.Paul, G P C Nair. His first novel Vasavadatha interprets the evolution of a person from extra materialistic desires to high spiritual insight is considered as one of his best work. Vasavadatha Novel Won the Prestigious Malayattoor Award. Vasavadatha was translated to English. Vasavadatha English version was released in UN headquarters Washington by UNICEF public policy Director David Wing. He wrote an epic novel titled 'Avarnnan' based on the life of Arattupuzha velayudha paniker, an iconic name in the history of kerala Renaissance.He written and directed the first historical T.V.Series in Kerala titled Paliyathachan.  As a part of Kerala governments action plan of one hundred days a few selected interviews with eminent personalities prepared by Sajil Sreedhar was published in book form.  He won the first M.K. Sanu Literary award for Best Biography in 2015. He wrote an in-depth critical study book based on veteran filmmaker Adoor Gopalakrishnan. Another major work from him was Thirakkathayude Sancharavazhikal analyses the esthetic side of Malayalam screenplays of 90 years. Srushtiparathayude Ananya saubhagam, study on Malayalam Novels of 130 years published by Kerala Linguistic institute owned by state government. He was a jury member of Kerala state film awards in 2013. He was worked as the Editor of Mangalam Daily Sunday Suppliment, Weekly, Kanyaka Fortnightly, Live in Style Trimonthly.

Books 
 Vasavadatha[Malayalam]
 Vasavadatha[English]
 Athikayan
 Shadpadam
 Nyayapramanam
 Avarnnan
 Sameepadrushyam
 Pranayamapini
 Bhoomadhyarekha
 Royal Salute
 Paramapadam
 Aathmasaurabham
 Aksharamala 
  Sarvajnapeedom 
 Saantha 
 Sakhavinte Ithihasam Kathakal Sajil sreedhar Emsinte Kathrika 
 Thakkol 
 Ente priya novellakal Moonu pranaya novelettukal Kathayude akamporul Thirakkathayude sancharavazhikal Srushtiparathayude ananya saubhagam Adoor Sarvajaneenathayude drusyethihasam Anubhavangalkku mukhamukham Penkazhchakal Thajmahal Paliyathachan M.T.ezhuthinte athmavu Thilakan jeevitham ,ormma Ente Innalekal Padam onnu G P C Ormmakkilivathil Ormakalilekku oru yathra Mikacha sambrambhakanakan 100 vazhikal K.P.paulinte vijayamanthrangal Flying to the dreams Lokaprasastharude vijayarahasyangal M.T noorumeni'' Thennali Raman''

Awards and honors 
 Malayaattoor Award (2021)
 Thirunalloor Karunakaran Award (2018)
 S. K. Pottakkattu Award (2016)
 M. K. Sanusahitya Award (2015)
 Athmayanagalude Khazak Award (2015)
 K.Damodaran Award
Vayalar Samskarika vedi Award
Thomas pala award

References 

1979 births
Living people
Malayalam-language journalists
Malayalam-language writers